The Texas Southern Tigers American football team played 11 matches in the 2006 season, of which they won 3.

Schedule

References

Texas Southern schedule and results
NCAA slams TSU athletics with 5 years' probation
Johnnie Cole's show cause upheld

Texas Southern
Texas Southern Tigers football seasons
College football winless seasons
Texas Southern Tigers football